Sarcocheilichthys parvus is a species of cyprinid fish found in China.

References

Sarcocheilichthys
Taxa named by John Treadwell Nichols
Fish described in 1930